The Old West Salem City Hall served West Salem, Oregon, United States, as its city hall from 1935 until the city merged with Salem in 1949. It was built using WPA funds. After serving as a city hall, it was used for other Salem government functions. The West Salem Branch of the Salem Public Library was established there in 1957 and occupied the first floor until it moved out in 1987 due to the building's deterioration.

The Art Deco building was restored for use as private offices and was placed on the National Register of Historic Places in 1990.

See also
Picture in 2009

References

External links
Historic images of West Salem City Hall from Salem Public Library

Works Progress Administration in Oregon
Buildings and structures in Salem, Oregon
Art Deco architecture in Oregon
City halls in Oregon
National Register of Historic Places in Salem, Oregon
1935 establishments in Oregon
City and town halls on the National Register of Historic Places in Oregon
Former seats of local government